Park Sang-won (born April 5, 1959) is a South Korean actor. He is best known for starring in four of the highest-rating Korean dramas of all time, Eyes of Dawn (1991), Sandglass (1995), First Love (1996), and You and I.

Filmography

Television series

 It's Beautiful Now (2022)
My Only One (2018) 
My Daughter, Geum Sa-wol (2015)
Healer (2014)
Rosy Lovers (2014)
Faith (2012)
My Daughter the Flower (2011)
Golden Fish (2010)
Dream (2009)
Again, My Love  (2009)
The Legend (2007)
Land (2004)
Like a Flowing River (2002)
Daemang (The Great Ambition) (2002)
Man of Autumn (2001)
I Still Love You (2001)
Golden Era (2000)
You (1999)
Love and Success (1998)
White Nights 3.98 (1998)
You and I (1997)
First Love (1996)
Sandglass (1995)
Asphalt Man (1995)
Thaw (1995)
Goblin Is Coming (1994)
Ambitions on Sand (1992)
Time and Tears (1992)
Rainbow in Mapo (1992)
Women's Room (1992)
Eyes of Dawn (1991)
Seoul Sinawi (1989)
Sleepless Tree (1989)
Our Town (1988)
Human Market (1988)
MBC Bestseller Theater "River" (1987)

Film
The Last Defense (1997)
Ivan the Mercenary (1997)
Seoul Evita (1991)

Variety show
Untangodo Village Hotel 2 (2023) 
Dancing with the Stars: Season 3 (2013)
Unanswered Questions (2006-2008)
Missing: An Open Investigation (2004-2005)
Beautiful TV Faces with Park Sang-won (1997-2002)
Home and Mother with Park Sang-won (1997)

Theater
42nd Street (2013)
Evita (2011-2012)
Rain Man (2010)
42nd Street (2009-2010)
Once Upon a Time (2009)
Le Paisse-Muraille (2006)

Awards
2010 MBC Drama Awards: Golden Acting Award, Actor in a Serial Drama (Golden Fish)
2009 Museum of Contemporary Art Tokyo: Sak-Il-Hoi Award
2006 Ministry of Government Administration and Home Affairs: Minister's Commendation
1995 SBS Drama Awards: Top Excellence Award, Actor (Sandglass)
1992 28th Baeksang Arts Awards: Most Popular Actor (TV) (Eyes of Dawn)
1989 25th Baeksang Arts Awards: Best New Actor (TV) (Human Market)
1988 MBC Drama Awards: Best New Actor (Human Market)

References

External links

ParknNam theater production company

South Korean male television actors
South Korean male stage actors
Seoul Institute of the Arts alumni
People from Daegu
1959 births
Living people
20th-century South Korean male actors
South Korean male film actors
Best New Actor Paeksang Arts Award (television) winners